Simon Frederick James Marquis, 3rd Earl of Woolton (born 24 May 1958), styled Viscount Walberton between 1964 and 1969, is a British peer and businessman.

He was a hereditary member of the House of Lords from 1979 until 1999.

Biography
Woolton is the son of Roger Marquis, 2nd Earl of Woolton, and his second wife, Josephine Gordon-Cumming, now Countess Lloyd George of Dwyfor.

He graduated from St. Andrews University in 1981 with an MA degree in Economics and Modern History. He married the Honourable Sophie Birdwood, daughter of the 3rd Baron Birdwood, in 1987. They had three daughters before divorcing on 13 May 1997.
 Lady Olivia Alice Marquis (born 16 April 1990)
 Lady Constance Elizabeth Marquis (born 14 October 1991)
 Lady Claudia Louise Marquis (born 3 March 1995)

On 28 October 1999, Lord Woolton married Mary Carol Davidson. Davidson has two daughters from a previous marriage.

He was a director of New Boathouse Capital and was Chief Financial Officer of Quayle Munro.

References

External links

1958 births
Earls in the Peerage of the United Kingdom
Living people
Alumni of the University of St Andrews
Chief financial officers

Woolton